Oxetorone, as oxetorone fumarate (brand names Nocertone, Oxedix), is a serotonin antagonist, antihistamine, and alpha blocker used as an antimigraine drug. Association with hyperprolactinemia has been described and antidopaminergic actions are also suspected.

References

Antimigraine drugs
Alpha blockers
H1 receptor antagonists
Heterocyclic compounds with 4 rings
Serotonin receptor antagonists
Oxygen heterocycles
Tetracyclic compounds